Our Lady of Begoña College, Bilbao, Spain, was founded by the Society of Jesus in 1921 and now includes primary through baccalaureate.

History 
In 1921 Our Lady of Begoña school opened at Allende Villa. The next year construction of a proper school building began, and Our Lady of Begña church was added in 1930. The pavilion "Diaz de Haro" came in 1940 and in 1946 a science building. In 1951 the area changed with the opening of Calle Simón Bolívar. Then in 1960 the block of Indautxu was built along with the sports pavilion "Areiza".

See also
 List of Jesuit sites

References  

Jesuit secondary schools in Spain
Catholic schools in Spain
Educational institutions established in 1921
1921 establishments in Spain